Trichopteryx  is a genus of African plants in the grass family.

 Species 
 Trichopteryx dregeana Nees 
 Trichopteryx elegantula (Hook.f.) Stapf 
 Trichopteryx fruticulosa Chiov. 
 Trichopteryx marungensis Chiov.
 Trichopteryx stolziana Henrard
 formerly included
numerous species now considered better suited to other genera: Danthoniopsis Loudetia Loudetiopsis Tristachya

References

Panicoideae
Poaceae genera
Taxa named by Christian Gottfried Daniel Nees von Esenbeck